The Tembeling River is a river in Pahang, Malaysia. It is a main tributary of the Pahang River.

See also
 List of rivers of Malaysia

References

Rivers of Pahang
Rivers of Malaysia